Khuzestani Arabs are the Arab inhabitants of the Khuzestan province and the largest Arab community in Iran which primarily reside in the western half of Khuzestan. This area is known as Ahwaz by the Arab community, and the capital of Khuzestan is Ahvaz. As of 2010, Khuzestani Arabs numbered around 1.6 million people.

History 
Since the 16th century, Khuzestan was slowly becoming arabicized, due to new Arabic-speaking settlers arriving from Mesopotamia, such as the Banu Ka'b. Due to influx of Shi'i Arab tribes invited by the Safavids to act as a bulwark against the Ottoman Empire, the western part of Khuzestan became known as Arabestan. According to the Iranologist Rudi Matthee, this name change took place during the reign of Shah Abbas I. Like the provinces of Kurdistan and Lorestan, the name of Arabestan did not have a "national" implication. 

Later on, the whole Khuzestan province came to be known as Arabestan. It is uncertain when this change occurred. According to Rudi Matthee, it was first during the reign of the Afsharid ruler Nader Shah, that this happened. The Iranologist Houchang Chehabi considers this to have taken place in the second half of the 18th century. Another Iranologist, Roger Savory, considers this change to have happened later, by the 19th century. The name was reverted back to Khuzestan by Reza Shah in 1925.

Language 

Nearly all Khuzestani Arabs are bilingual, speaking Arabic and Persian (the official language of the country). In the northern and eastern cities of Khuzestan, Luri is spoken in addition to Persian, and the Arabic of the Kamari Arabs of this region is "remarkably influenced" by Luri.

Geography
Arabs are estimated to be scattered through 65% of the area of Khuzestan Province, which they share with Lurs, Bakhtiaris, Kowlis and Persian-speakers. Cities that have significant Arab population include Ahvaz, Khorramshahr, Abadan, Shadegan, Hoveyzeh and Susangerd.

Demographics

Shahbaz Shahnavaz noted that the Arab population in Khuzestan is "a hybrid race with a considerable infusion of Persian blood", and observed that "as a result of generations of contacts, the Arabs of Khuzestan had more in common with their fellow Persian countrymen than with their brethren across the border in the Ottoman territory". He wrote that Arabs in Khuzestan had adopted Iranian customs, manners, ceremonious occasions, and even dress (with the exception of headgear).

Religion 
While the majority of Arabs in Khuzestan follow the Shia branch of Islam, there are also a few Sunni Muslims, Christians, Jews and Mandaeans.

Tribes 
Tribalism is an significant characteristic of Arab population in Khuzestan. Although tribal bonds have been weakened during the 20th century, it is still regarded important. Social units among Khuzestani Arabs include beyt (household or group of families), hamule
(clan), ‘ashire (tribe), as well as tayefe and qabile (tribal confederacies). 

According to John Gordon Lorimer, the most important Arab tribes at the turn of the 20th century were:

Genetic studies 

According to Farjadian and Ghaderi who had studied HLA class II allele and haplotype frequencies, Khuzestani Arabs might be genetically different from other Arabs and that their genetic affinity with other Iranian people "might be the result of their common ancestry". Hajjej et al. found that Khuzestani Arabs have close relatedness with Gabesians. Haplogroup J1-M267 reaches 33.4% in samples from Khuzestan, higher than in other parts of Iran. It also reaches a frequency of 31.6% in Khuzestani Arabs.

Discrimination allegations
According to Amnesty International, Ahwazi Arabs face discrimination by the authorities concerning politics, employment and cultural rights, whereas Iran completely rejects such accusations, and considers such charges exaggerated. There have also been many arrests of Ahwazi Arabs who have converted to Sunni Islam, which is considered a crime in Iran according to the British activist Peter Tatchell. Meanwhile, according to the Islamic Republic of Iran, there is no such crime or penalty in its law for converting to Sunnism.

The rise in conversion to Sunni Islam is partly a result of anti-Arab discrimination, the perceived crackdown on the Arab identity of the region and the view that Sunni Islam is closer to the Arab roots of the Ahwazi Arabs. According to the International Campaign for Sunni Prisoners in Iran (ICSPI), the crackdown is due to the Iranian government's alarm at "the rise of Sunni Islam among the Ahwazi Arabs in the traditionally Shia-majority Khuzestan province." As a result of these conversions, Sunni Arabs across the Middle East have increasingly shown support for the Ahwazi cause.

Politics 

Foreign actors such as the United Kingdom and the Ba'athist Iraq tried to exploit and spread ethnic sentiments as a leverage. During Iran–Iraq War, Khuzestani Arabs rejected calls made by Saddam Hussein for siding with Iraq and resisted against his invasion. 

According to Yadullah Shahibzadeh, when Mohammad Khatami took power in the late 1990s, "Arab activists 
in Khuzestan used the reform movement as a ticket to display the mobilizing capacity of the Arab politics of identity". 2003 Iranian local elections marked a victory for advocates of Arab identity politics in the southwest of Khuzestan province. 

A few months later, the Islamic Reconciliation Party that championed defending the Arab community in Khuzestan, was split into two factions. The democratic faction that was committed to the reform movement and its democratization platform, and a traditional faction with radical Arab nationalist tendencies. The former faction that coordinated their activities with the Islamic Iran Participation Front, left the party and founded Al-Afaq Party resulting in the Arab nationalist faction dominating the Islamic Reconciliation Party. Arab politics of identity then became more radical and adopted a self-defeating strategy of political subjectivity that instead of "consolidating their status as Iranian citizens with full political and civil rights... challenged other groups who demanded equal rights for all citizens" and resulted in polarization of the local public sphere between Arabs and non-Arabs. By 2005 and the time Mahmoud Ahmadinejad took office, Arab politics of identity ceased to exist as a local political force in Khuzestan province.

Notes

References

Sources
 
 
 
 
 
 
 
 
 
 
 
 
 

 
Ethnic groups in Iran
Arab diaspora in Asia
Ethnic groups in the Middle East